Wells Municipal Airport  is a city-owned, public-use airport located three nautical miles (6 km) west of the central business district of Wells, a city in Faribault County, Minnesota, United States.

Facilities and aircraft 
Land was purchased in 1964 and the Wells Municipal Airport opened in August 1966.

Wells Municipal Airport covers an area of 45 acres (18 ha) at an elevation of 1,119 feet (341 m) above mean sea level. It has one runway designated 17/35 with a turf surface measuring 2,912 by 198 feet (888 x 60 m).

For the 12-month period ending June 30, 2010, the airport had 6,000 general aviation aircraft operations, an average of 16 per day. At that time there were eight aircraft based at this airport, all single-engine.

A North_American F-86L, serial 53-0719, serves as a gate guard at the airport entrance.

References

External links 

 Airport page at City of Wells website
 Wells Municipal Airport (68Y) at Minnesota DOT Airport Directory
 Aerial image as of April 1991 from USGS The National Map
 

Airports in Minnesota
Transportation in Faribault County, Minnesota